James Burton Nicholson Jr. (born February 28, 1949) is a former American football offensive tackle who played professionally in the National Football League (NFL). He was selected in ninth round of the 1973 NFL Draft by the Los Angeles Rams and was traded in 1974 to the Kansas City Chiefs for a fifth-round draft pick.  Nicholson started at right tackle for the Chiefs for six seasons, from 1974 to 1979. He was picked up on waivers by the San Diego Chargers in 1980 and played one game with the San Francisco 49ers in 1981.

References

1949 births
Living people
American football offensive tackles
Michigan State Spartans football players
Kansas City Chiefs players
San Francisco 49ers players
Players of American football from Honolulu
American sportspeople of Samoan descent